Mohamed Ibrahim Abdullah Kanno (born 22 September 1994) is a Saudi Arabian football player who plays as a central midfielder for Al-Hilal.

Club career

Ettifaq
Kanno was playing at Ettifaq in 2013–2017, but they were relegated in 2014. In 2016, Kanno helped his team get back into the league. He left in 2017 to join Al-Hilal.

Al-Hilal
On the 3rd July 2017, Kanno moved to Al-Hilal on a five year contract.

International career
In May 2018 he was named in Saudi Arabia's preliminary squad for the 2018 FIFA World Cup in Russia.

At the 2022 FIFA World Cup, he started all three group stage matches for Saudi Arabia. Despite defeating eventual champion  Argentina in their first match, Saudi Arabia finished fourth in their group and did not advance to the knockout stage.

Career statistics

Club

International
Statistics accurate as of match played 30 November 2022.

International goals
As of 8 December 2019.

Scores and results list Saudi Arabia's goal tally first.

Honours
Al-Ettifaq
Saudi First Division: 2015–16

Al-Hilal
Pro League: 2017–18, 2019–20, 2020–21, 2021–22
King Cup: 2019–20
Saudi Super Cup: 2018, 2021
AFC Champions League: 2019, 2021

References

External links

1994 births
Living people
People from Khobar
Saudi Arabian footballers
Ettifaq FC players
Al Hilal SFC players
Association football midfielders
Saudi First Division League players
Saudi Professional League players
2018 FIFA World Cup players
Saudi Arabia youth international footballers
Saudi Arabia international footballers
2022 FIFA World Cup players